Robert of Bar (1390 – 25 October 1415) was Lord of Marle between 1397 and 1413, Count of Marle between 1413 and 1415 and Count of Soissons between 1412 and 1415.

He was the only child of Henry of Bar and Marie I de Coucy, Countess of Soissons. His great-grandfather was Edward III.

Because his father was the eldest son of Robert I of Bar, Robert claimed the Duchy of Bar. He only renounced his claims after a large financial compensation and the elevation of Marle to a County. In 1412 he also became Count of Soissons. 
Robert was one of the many French casualties at the Battle of Agincourt.

Robert married in 1409 Jeanne de Béthune, Viscountess of Meaux (d. 1450), daughter of  Robert VIII de Béthune, Viscount of Meaux. They had one child, a daughter: 
 Jeanne de Bar, Countess of Marle and Soissons, Dame d'Oisy, Viscountess of Meaux suo jure (1415 – 14 May 1462), married Louis de Luxembourg, Count of Saint-Pol, of Brienne, de Ligny, and Conversano by whom she had seven children.

References

Sources

1390 births
1415 deaths
14th-century French people
15th-century French people
Counts
French military personnel killed in action
People of the Hundred Years' War